Fort Myers Beach is a town located on the North end of Estero Island in Lee County, Florida, United States.  The town is on the Gulf of Mexico and is accessed from the mainland by a bridge over Estero Bay. The population was 5,582 at the 2020 census. It is part of the Cape Coral-Fort Myers, Florida Metropolitan Statistical Area. It was officially incorporated on December 31, 1995.

Geography

Fort Myers Beach is located at  (26.438676, –81.925620).

The town is situated on the North end of Estero Island, one of the barrier islands in the Gulf of Mexico off the coast of Fort Myers, Florida.

Climate 

Fort Myers Beach has a tropical climate and has the following statistics on average. It receives 56 inches of rain and 0 inches of snow per year. The number of days with any measurable precipitation is 76. There are 265 sunny days per year. The July high is around 89 degrees and the low is 75 degrees. The January high is 75 and the low is 55.

History

Early history 
The Calusa Indians first inhabited Estero Island, the island that Fort Myers Beach occupies, 2,000 years ago. The Calusa Indians resisted Spanish colonization attempts successfully including those by Ponce de León in 1513 and 1521. The Calusa met their demise 150 years later due to disease, hostilities, and political and economic upheaval. In the mid to late 1700s, Cuban fishermen then began to settle a small fishing village known as a Ranchero. This effectively displaced the remaining Calusa. In 1845, Florida became the 27th state.

American settlement 
The Homestead Act of 1862 initiated American settlements on Estero Island. In 1862, Robert Gilbert received a homestead grant at the end of Connecticut Street, the highest point on Fort Myers Beach. In 1911, William Case developed the first subdivision and cottage rental industry. By 1914, all the property on the island was homesteaded with little industry beyond a hotel, fishing, gardening, and a sawmill operated by the Koreshan Unity (a communal society based on mainland Estero). At this point, Estero Island was named Crescent Beach.

Development on Crescent Beach was slow until the 1920s when Florida gained national attention as a vacation destination. In 1921, a toll bridge was opened connecting the beach to the mainland, followed closely by the construction of two casinos, hotels, a pier and the island's first canal. The land boom ended with the hurricanes of 1921 and 1926 that challenged the paradise appeal of southwest Florida. Despite entering a depression, Crescent Beach continued to gain small businesses, restaurants, subdivisions, and a school. In the 1950s, Crescent Beach continued to modernize. Many hotels were built including the Rancho del Mar, which boasted the first swimming pool. Additionally, the swing bridge was electrified to facilitate traffic. During this time, "pink gold" or pink shrimp were discovered igniting the shrimping industry and ancillary businesses to support it as the population increased by 50 percent. During this second land boom, numerous civic organizations, churches, local newspapers, weather and US Coast Guard stations, and the Beach Library were added to the island. The library became the first free public library in Lee County and opened in 1955 in a one-room cottage with a single librarian.

Incorporation 
Fort Myers Beach has continued to develop to the present day. The island has a mix of year-round and seasonal residents, as well as a vibrant tourism industry. On December 31, 1995, legislation was passed to incorporate the town of Fort Myers Beach.

Hurricane Ian
On September 28, 2022, Hurricane Ian made landfall just north of the town as a high-end Category 4 hurricane, causing catastrophic damage and substantial loss of life in the city from high winds and destructive storm surge, which decimated the majority of homes and businesses along the coastline, including the popular Times Square.

Demographics

As of the census of 2010, there were 6,277 people in 3,444 households residing in the town. The racial makeup of the town was 97.7% White, 0.3% African American, 0.2% Native American, 0.6% Asian, 0.02% Pacific Islander, 0.5% from other races, and 0.7% from two or more races. Hispanic or Latino of any race were 2.8% of the population.

There were 3,444 households, out of which 7.9% had children under the age of 18 living with them, 50.4% were married couples living together, 4.0% had a female householder with no husband present, and 43.4% were non-families. 35.6% of all households were made up of individuals, and 17.7% had someone living alone who was 65 years of age or older.  The average household size was 1.81 and the average family size was 2.23.

In the town, the population was spread out, with 5.4% under the age of 18, 3.2% from 18 to 24, 11.6% from 25 to 44, 34.9% from 45 to 64, and 45.4% who were 65 years of age or older.  The median age was 63.2 years. For every 100 females, there were 97.9 males.  For every 100 females age 18 and over, there were 96.9 males.

The median income for a household in the town was $55,213, and the median income for a family was $79,292. Males had a median income of $41,761 versus $39,961 for females. The per capita income for the town was $57,902.

Government
Fort Myers Beach is governed by a five-member town council. The current town council consists of Mayor Dan Allers, Vice Mayor Jim Atterholt, Council Member John R. King, Council Member Bill Veach, and Council Member Karen Woodson. The town attorney, John Herin, works with the Town Council to implement plans.

The Town of Fort Myers Beach also operates Mound House Cultural and Environmental Learning Center located at 451 Connecticut Street, Newton Beach Park located at 4650 Estero Boulevard, Bay Oaks Recreational Campus (BORC) located at 2731 Oak Street, and Bayside Park located at San Carlos Boulevard and First Street. A few features of BORC include four full-size outdoor tennis courts, an 18-hole disc golf course, two full-size indoor basketball courts, weight room and a public pool that offers a children's pool along with a large slide. The pool is also available for lap swimmers.

Times Square is the retail, restaurant, and entertainment center of the Town of Fort Myers Beach, which also has public beach access.

Education

Primary schools 
 Fort Myers Beach Elementary School: the only primary school located on Fort Myers Beach. The school is limited to children who live on Estero and San Carlos Islands or have families who work on the Beach. Fort Myers Beach is the smallest public elementary school in Lee County. It is an A-ranked school.

Secondary schools 
There are no secondary schools on Fort Myers Beach. See Lee County School District for other public schools in Lee County that school-age children on Fort Myers can attend.

Churches
The Chapel by the Sea was the first church on the island.  A congregation of the Presbyterian Church (USA), Chapel by the Sea was started in 1932 as a mission of the Presbyterians.  It was officially founded one year later.  The first building was constructed in 1937 with a seating capacity of 47.  Today's Sanctuary holds 700.  Although it is Presbyterian, the Chapel is known on the island as the community church.  The church hosts "God's Table" feeding the poor and needy of the beach every day, Monday through Friday.

Saint Raphael's Episcopal Church was the second church built on the island.  It was founded on March 5, 1951, and the church was built in 1953.  They are known for hosting the island's annual Blessing of the Shrimp Fleet, a tradition started in 1952 to bless all the boats and their crews.

Other churches on the island are the Roman Catholic Church of the Ascension, the Beach United Methodist Church, St. Peter's Lutheran Church, and the Beach Baptist Church.

Public transportation
Fort Myers Beach is served by LeeTran buses operated by the county.

Community events

Fort Myers Beach Lions Club Shrimp Festival 
The Fort Myers Beach Lions Club Shrimp Festival takes place in March. The Shrimp Festival celebrates the shrimping industry on Fort Myers Beach. It consists of a shrimp eating competition, a 5k run, a parade, a pageant, and a food and crafts exposition.

Taste of the Beach 
Taste of the Beach takes place in May. Taste of the Beach is an event where local restaurants offer samples of their signature dishes for purchase and compete for top Taste of the Beach Award in categories such as Best Appetizer, Best Beef Dish, Best Seafood Dish, Best Chicken Dish, Best Dessert, Best Decorated Booth, and People's choice award. Live music is performed throughout the event.

Fort Myers Beach Pirate Festival 
The Fort Myers Beach Pirate Festival takes place the second weekend in October. The Fort Myers Beach Pirate Festival was named the #2 Pirate Festival in the Country by USA. This family-friendly event attracts thousands of people that come to enjoy the pirate bazaar, themed live music and performances, live ship battles, children's activities and the jolly pub quest (21+ event).

American Sand Sculpting Championship 
The American Sand Sculpting Championship takes place in November. This is the largest sand sculpting event in the United States. Nearly 47,000 attendees visit and 2000 tons of sand are sculpted.

Fort Myers Beach Christmas Boat Parade 
The Fort Myers Beach Christmas Boat Parade takes place in December. The event features 30 to 50 illuminated boats decorated with an array of animated Christmas scenes and filling the air with Christmas carols. The parade travels through the Back Bay and passes by some restaurants.

Gallery

References

External links
Town of Fort Myers Beach official site
Greater Fort Myers Beach Area Chamber of Commerce
Fort Myers Beach Public Library

Towns in Lee County, Florida
Populated coastal places in Florida on the Gulf of Mexico
Towns in Florida
Former census-designated places in Florida
Beaches of Lee County, Florida
Beaches of Florida